Ernault is a French surname. Notable people with the surname include:

Nicolas Ernault des Bruslys (1757–1809), French general and governor of Île Bonaparte
Romuald Ernault (born 1977), French weightlifter

French-language surnames